Faure Essozimna Gnassingbé Eyadéma (born 6 June 1966) is a Togolese politician who has been the president of Togo since 2005. Before assuming the presidency, he was appointed by his father, President Gnassingbé Eyadéma, as Minister of Equipment, Mines, Posts, and Telecommunications, serving from 2003 to 2005.

Following President Eyadéma's death in 2005, Gnassingbé was immediately installed as president with support from the army. Doubts regarding the constitutional legitimacy of the succession led to heavy regional pressure being placed on Gnassingbé, and he subsequently resigned on 25 February. He then won a controversial presidential election on 24 April 2005, and was sworn in as president. Gnassingbé was re-elected for a second term in 2010.

In the April 2015 presidential election, Gnassingbé won a third term, defeating his main challenger, Jean-Pierre Fabre, by a margin of about 59% to 35%, according to official results. In the February 2020 presidential elections, Gnassingbé won his fourth presidential term in office as the president of Togo. According to the official result, he won with a margin of around 72% of the vote share. This enabled him to defeat his closest challenger, the former prime minister Agbeyome Kodjo who had 18%. The legitimacy of elections in Togo is widely disputed.

Background
Born in Afagnan in Lacs Prefecture, Faure Essozimna Gnassingbé is of Kabye descent and is one of Gnassingbé Eyadéma's many children; his mother is Séna Sabine Mensah. Gnassingbé received his secondary education in Lomé before studying in Paris at the Université Paris-Dauphine, where he received a degree in financial business management; he subsequently obtained a Master of Business Administration degree from The George Washington University in the United States. He was elected to the National Assembly of Togo in the October 2002 parliamentary election as a Deputy for Blitta, and in the National Assembly he was coordinator of the commission in charge of privatization. On July 29, 2003, he was appointed as Minister of Equipment, Mines, Posts, and Telecommunications, serving in that position until becoming president in February 2005.

Some in the opposition claimed that the amendment of the Constitution in December 2002, lowering the minimum age for the president from 45 years to 35 years, was intended to benefit Gnassingbé. His appointment to the government in July 2003 came after he had already been appearing with his father at official functions and contributed to speculation that he was intended as his father's successor.

Politics

Eyadéma died suddenly on February 5, 2005. According to the Togolese Constitution, after the president's death, the president of the National Assembly should become acting president. At the time of Eyadéma's death, National Assembly President Fambaré Ouattara Natchaba was out of the country, and Gnassingbé was sworn in as acting president to "ensure stability". Many believe that Natchaba did not want to come back to Togo due to fears of assassination by the Gnassingbé clan. The army wanted him to resign his position and allow Gnassingbé to legally take over. The African Union denounced Gnassingbé's assumption of power as a military coup.

Legitimacy

A day after his father's death, the National Assembly received clear instructions to dismiss Natchaba and elect Gnassingbé in his place, which would legalize his succession, which took place on 6 February 2005. Gnassingbé's election was unanimously approved by the deputies (98% of them were members of the ruling party) who were present in the National Assembly at the time; the opposition was not represented in the National Assembly due to its boycott of the 2002 parliamentary election. The members of Gnassingbé's party did not want to challenge the army's choice. The parliament also eliminated a constitutional requirement that elections be held within 60 days of the president's death, enabling the younger Gnassingbé to rule until the expiration of his father's term in 2008.

Under pressure from others in the region, and particularly Nigeria, later in February 2005 Gnassingbé announced that new elections would be held within 60 days, but said that he would remain in office in the meantime. However, on February 21, the National Assembly reversed some of the constitutional changes that it had made so as to allow Gnassingbé to assume power, although it did not instruct him to resign. This was construed as a way of pressuring him to stand down with dignity. To change the constitution during a period of transition was itself an unconstitutional act, but this did not deter Gnassingbé's allies.

On February 25, Gnassingbé was nominated by delegates of the ruling party, the Rally for the Togolese People, as the party's presidential candidate. He was also chosen as head of the party. Shortly afterwards, he announced that he would step down as president during the interim period. Bonfoh Abass was appointed by the National Assembly to replace him until the election on April 24, 2005. Bonfoh was considered by some to be a puppet of the military elite and the Gnassingbé family. Gnassingbé competed with the main opposition candidate, Emmanuel Bob-Akitani, a retired engineer of the state-owned mining company and the second most important person in the opposition coalition after Gilchrist Olympio. Olympio could not take part in the election, since the constitution required that any candidate must have lived for at least 12 months in Togo, and Olympio had been in self-imposed exile for fear that he would be murdered by the Eyadema clan like his father.

In the election, Gnassingbé received slightly more than 60% of the votes, according to official results. The RPT refused to allow oversight during the counting of the ballots. The EU and the Carter Center deemed the elections to be fraudulent. Mass protests by the coalition of opposition parties led to the killing of over 1,000 citizens by security forces. 40,000 refugees fled to neighboring Benin and Ghana.

Corruption
The phosphates sector – accounting for 40% of export revenues – is managed at the office of the president, and it is alleged that contracts and permits to manage the sector are sold to profit the president.

See also
 History of Togo
 Politics of Togo

References

External links

 Official website
 Violent rioting, deaths follow disputed election in Togo, Wikinews
 Togo Elections on Tv

|-

1966 births
George Washington University School of Business alumni
Living people
Members of the National Assembly (Togo)
Presidents of the National Assembly (Togo)
People from Maritime Region
Presidents of Togo
Rally of the Togolese People politicians
Union for the Republic (Togo) politicians
Children of national leaders
21st-century Togolese politicians